The 2010 Porsche Mobil 1 Supercup season was the 18th Porsche Supercup season. It began on 13 March in Bahrain, and finished on 12 September at Monza, after ten races. Once again, the series was on the support package of the Formula One World Championship at all European rounds except Turkey.

The series was won by German René Rast, who won four out of first five races. Briton Nick Tandy was a runner-up with three wins.

Teams and drivers

Race calendar and results
 The calendar was announced on 4 December 2009.

Championship standings

† — Drivers did not finish the race, but were classified as they completed over 90% of the race distance.

 Nick Tandy was awarded the two points for pole position in Germany after qualifying second behind guest driver Nicolas Armindo, who was ineligible to collect points.

References

External links
The Porsche Mobil 1 Supercup website
Porsche Mobil 1 Supercup Online Magazine

Porsche Supercup seasons
Porsche Supercup